KFFX may refer to:

 KFFX-TV, a television station (channel 11 analog/8 digital) licensed to Pendleton, Oregon, United States
 KFFX (FM), a radio station (104.9 FM) licensed to Emporia, Kansas, United States